David Main Liston Morris (1897 – 1971) was a Scottish footballer who played as a centre half for Newtongrange Star, Arniston Rangers, Raith Rovers, Preston North End, Chester City, Dundee United and Scotland national team. 

After moving from the junior level where he had combined football with work as a shipbuilder in his native Leith, Morris helped Raith Rovers achieve their best-ever Scottish Football League finishes of third in 1921–22 then fourth in 1923–24 before going south to Preston in December 1925, a few months after Alex James made the same move. However, the pair (and several other Scots in the squad) were unable to achieve promotion from the English second division and both departed from Deepdale in 1929. After two years with Chester, he returned to Scotland with Dundee United in 1931.

Morris received all six of his caps for Scotland (and one for the Scottish Football League XI) while with Raith Rovers. He is the only serving player from the Kirkcaldy club to have been international captain and appeared for his country six times in total, finishing on the winning side five times with the other match drawn.

See also
List of Scotland national football team captains

References 

Sources

External links 
 

 

1897 births
1971 deaths
Date of death missing
Footballers from Edinburgh
People from Leith
Scottish footballers
Scotland international footballers
Newtongrange Star F.C. players
Arniston Rangers F.C. players
Raith Rovers F.C. players
Preston North End F.C. players
Chester City F.C. players
Dundee United F.C. players
Leith Athletic F.C. players
Scottish Junior Football Association players
Scottish Football League players
English Football League players
Scottish Football League representative players
Association football central defenders